Twortvirus is a genus of viruses in the order Caudovirales, in the family Herelleviridae, in the subfamily Twortvirinae. Bacteria serve as natural hosts. There is only one species in this genus: Staphylococcus virus Twort.

Twortvirus is named as after the British bacteriological Frederick Twort.

Structure
Viruses in this genus are nonenveloped, with a head and tail. The head is approximately 84 nm to 94 nm in diameter and T=16 symmetry. The tail is around 140 nm to 219 nm long, has 6 long terminal fibers, 6 short spikes, globular structures at the tip, and a double base plate. The tail is enclosed in a sheath, which loosens and slides around the tail core upon contraction.

Life cycle
Viral replication is cytoplasmic. The virus attaches to the host cell using its tail fibers, and ejects the viral DNA into the host cytoplasm via contraction of its tail sheath. DNA-templated transcription is the method of transcription. Once the viral genes have been replicated, the procapsid is assembled and packed. The tail is then assembled and the mature virions are released via lysis. Bacteria serve as the natural host. Transmission routes are passive diffusion.

History
The genus Twortlikevirus was first accepted as a new genus, at the same time as all five of its contained species as well as its containing sub-family Peduovirinae, in ICTV's 2010–11 report. The new genus was proposed in 2009. The genus was renamed to Twortvirus in 2015.

Genome
Genomes are linear, around 130-140kb in length. The genome codes for 190 to 215  proteins.  Twort's genome is available on NCBI's website. Genomes range between 130k and 149k nucleotides, with 190 to 233 proteins. All complete genomes, as well as several additional "unclassified" virus genomes, are available online.

References

External links
 ICTV Report: Herelleviridae
 Viralzone: Twortlikevirus

Caudovirales
Virus genera